Excellentia is a management consulting company, based in Stockholm, Sweden. The company is a part of the Impact creation group AB and was founded in 2010 by the founder and CEO Therése Gedda. In 2008 the idea of Excellentia was created in New York. The company had their official Launch in the end of March 2011. Excellentia focuses on improving the efficiency, communication, leadership skills and entrepreneurial skills of a company's employees, and each of their programs falls under these four categories.

Excellentia’s speakers 
Excellentia have five speakers:
 John Alexander: PhD public speaker, cultural consultant, trend analyst and writer. John has been running workshops, presentations and training sessions for 20 years.
 Therése Gedda: Action-oriented entrepreneur with a background in management consulting, inspirational education and strategic business advising for executives and entrepreneurs in Sweden as well as in the UK and US.  She is the founder and CEO of Excellentia.
 Ronald Jones : Professor of Interdisciplinary Studies at Konstfack and leads The Experience Design Group. He is a guest professor in Experience Design at the National Institute of Design, Ahmedabad in India. Ronald holds a Certificate from the Harvard University Graduate School of Education and sits on numerous boards of cultural organizations.
 Thomas Lavelle:  Senior lecturer and Director of the Center for Modern Languages at Stockholm School of Economics (SSE).
 Gregg Vanourek:  Author and expert in the fields of leadership, entrepreneurship, and personal development. He has co-authored two books (including LIFE Entrepreneurs), with a new one in the works. He has also co-authored regular blogs for Harvard Business Online and written columns for The Washington Times.

References

External links 
 

Management consulting firms
Companies based in Stockholm